Albin Carl Bro (1893–1956) was a Christian missionary and educator, United States diplomat, and the fifth president of Shimer College.

Early life and education

Bro was born in Prentice, Wisconsin, on September 4, 1893.  In 1917, he graduated as valedictorian from Northland College with a Bachelor of Arts.  He entered into missionary service in China in 1919, working as an educational missionary until 1925, during which time he also served as a school principal.  He then served for a year (1925–1926) as an instructor at the University of Nanking.  According to the United States State Department Register, he subsequently worked as instructor at Northland College from 1927 to 1929, as a field secretary for a religious education association from 1929 to 1931 and a field worker for a pension fund from 1931 to 1932.

From 1932 to 1939, Bro worked in sales for the University of Chicago Press. He obtained his Litt.D. degree from the University in 1941.  He came to Frances Shimer Junior College as a product of the University of Chicago under Robert Maynard Hutchins.

Presidency

Bro assumed the presidency of Shimer College in 1939 and served until 1949.  He was the first Shimer president directly associated with the University of Chicago.  Under his administration, efforts were made to adopt aspects of the general education curriculum from the College of the University of Chicago.  In addition, Bro recruited faculty trained at the University of Chicago.  These efforts ultimately bore fruit in the more radical transformation that occurred under Bro's successor, Aaron Brumbaugh.

Throughout Bro's tenure, Shimer was a women's junior college.  It was known as "Frances Shimer Junior College" until 1942 and as "Frances Shimer College" thereafter.

Later life

In 1949 Bro left the presidency of Shimer and was appointed a Foreign Service Reserve officer.  He was assigned to Seoul as a cultural attaché on November 25, 1949.  He was initially granted only a one-year leave of absence from his Shimer position, as the State Department appointment was tentative.  However, Bro continued in this capacity until 1953.  He was succeeded as president of Shimer by Aaron Brumbaugh of the University of Chicago.

After his diplomatic service was complete, Bro returned to the Hyde Park neighborhood of Chicago. In 1956, Bro co-founded the Spiritual Frontiers Fellowship, a Spiritualist organization, together with Arthur Ford and Paul Higgins.  He died of a heart attack shortly thereafter, on March 6, 1956, while walking to church.

Albin Bro was the husband of Margueritte Harmon Bro, a prolific writer of children's and religious literature.  Their son Harmon Bro later served as chairman of the Board of Trustees of Shimer College.

Notes

See also
History of Shimer College

Presidents of Shimer College
1893 births
1956 deaths
People from Prentice, Wisconsin
Northland College (Wisconsin) alumni
University of Chicago alumni
Academic staff of the University of Nanking
20th-century American academics